Louaghnavalley or Loughnavally is a village in County Westmeath, Ireland. It is located at the crossroads of the R389 and the R390, to the west of Mullingar.

The Hill of Uisneach stands to the west of the town, near the village of Killare.

The village contains a Roman Catholic church, the Church of the Assumption, a national school and a bar.

Sport 

Loughnavalley GAA is a Gaelic football club that competes at Junior grade. The club was established in 1964 and its grounds are situated 2 km from the Hill of Uisneach. The club's underage teams are amalgamated with Castletown Geoghegan to form Lilliput Gaels.

See also 

 List of towns and villages in Ireland

References 

Towns and villages in County Westmeath